Clive Russell (born 7 December 1945) is a Scottish actor. He is known for his roles as Chief Inspector Frederick Abberline in Ripper Street, Angus O'Connor in Happiness and Brynden Tully in the HBO series Game of Thrones.

He also appeared in the Scottish sitcoms Still Game and Rab C Nesbitt, teen drama Hollyoaks as Jack Osborne's brother Billy Brodie and British crime drama Cracker as Danny Fitzgerald.

Life and career
Russell was born in the North Riding of Yorkshire, England but brought up in Fife, Scotland.

Russell first performed before an audience in 1960 on The Shari Lewis Show, but it was not until 1980 that he had his first real acting job – performing on the London stage as the superintendent in Nobel Prize-winner Dario Fo's satire Accidental Death of an Anarchist, about police corruption in Italy. The reviews were good, and he reprised that role for television in 1983. After further honing his skills in various British TV productions and a handful of films – including Jute City, The Power of One, The Hawk and Seconds Out – Russell received exposure before international audiences as Caleb Garth in the celebrated BBC miniseries Middlemarch, based on the George Eliot novel of the same name. A year later, he fell in love on the movie screen with Helena Bonham Carter in Margaret's Museum, for which he earned a Genie nomination at the 16th Genie Awards for Best Performance by an Actor in a Leading Role. After more TV roles and another film, Russell played Ralph Fiennes' father in another critically acclaimed film, Oscar and Lucinda. Growing recognition of his acting skills then brought him major roles in four major TV miniseries: Great Expectations, Oliver Twist, The Railway Children and The Mists of Avalon.

Television
Standing 6' 6", Russell is a familiar and unforgettable face on British television and has appeared in numerous television series including Boys from the Blackstuff, Hope and Glory, Neverwhere, Great Expectations, The Mists of Avalon, Heartburn Hotel, Roughnecks, Monarch of the Glen,  Midsomer Murders, Waking the Dead, Silent Witness, Rockface, and Spaced. Russell has also made appearances in Still Game, Happiness, Auf Wiedersehen, Pet, Cracker and The Railway Children. From 2005 to 2006, Russell played Phil Nail in ITV's Coronation Street. Russell made an appearance in Waterloo Road as Lisa and Lenny Brown's grandfather for one episode, also playing Billy Wilson for two in Shameless.

He has appeared as Jock in the third series of the BBC's Jam and Jerusalem, as "Bayard, King of Mercia" in Merlin  and in Hotel Babylon as an artist forced to fake his own death when he is in debt. In 2012, he joined the cast of the HBO fantasy drama Game of Thrones as Brynden "The Blackfish" Tully.

In 2016, he joined the cast of Hollyoaks as Billy, brother of established character Jack Osborne

In January 2017 he had a small role in the BBC Three comedy "Uncle", portraying Sam and Andy's father and later in the year appeared in Doc Martin. He played Ken Hollister.

In 2020, he appeared as Wroth, Chief of a Fey tribe called the Tusks, a recurring character for 5 episodes in the Netflix series Cursed.

Films
In Margaret's Museum, he starred opposite Helena Bonham Carter as the Gaelic-speaking Neil Currie. Russell's other film credits include Festival, Ladies in Lavender, King Arthur, Made of Honour, Lecture 21, The 13th Warrior and The Wolfman.

He made an appearance in the 2009 film Sherlock Holmes as Captain Tanner, and reprised the role in the film's 2011 sequel, Sherlock Holmes: A Game of Shadows. He appeared in the 2010 film The Wolfman as MacQueen. Russell also appeared in Robin Hardy's The Wicker Tree which was released in the first quarter of 2012, playing the character of Beame alongside the Hobbit star Graham McTavish.

He played Inspector Frederick Abberline in BBC One's Ripper Street. He played Tyr in the live-action film Thor: The Dark World (2013).

Edinburgh Fringe 2010
In 2010, Russell made his debut one-man show Touching the Blue.

Filmography

References

External links

1945 births
Living people
Scottish male film actors
Scottish male soap opera actors
Scottish male television actors
Scottish people of English descent
20th-century Scottish male actors
21st-century Scottish male actors
People associated with Fife